The McAlester House is an historic house located at 14 East Smith Avenue in McAlester, Oklahoma.

Description and history 
Named for its builder and first owner, the colorful J. J. McAlester, for whom McAlester was named, it began in 1870 as a four-room log house.  At the time, it was located in Tobucksy County, Choctaw Nation, in the Indian Territory. J. J. McAlester later surrounded the log structure with a single-story house and also built a much larger two-story Queen Anne style house joined by a breezeway to the smaller structure. Its furnishings, many of which remain to this day, reflected the prosperity and position that the McAlester family enjoyed in the community. The building was renovated in 1960 by J. L. McAlester, grandson of J. J. McAlester. In 1980, McAlester House was added to the National Register of Historic Places.
  
In the early 2000s, it was bought by its present owners who have continued the work of renovation and preservation. The house was featured in 2008 in a segment of the HGTV channel's If Walls Could Talk program. The segment continues on HGTV reruns and has been rebroadcast as recently as September 22, 2009.

References

Houses on the National Register of Historic Places in Oklahoma
Queen Anne architecture in Oklahoma
Houses completed in 1870
Houses in Pittsburg County, Oklahoma
National Register of Historic Places in Pittsburg County, Oklahoma